Benny Spellman (December 11, 1931 – June 3, 2011) was an American R&B singer, best known for the 1962 single "Lipstick Traces (on a Cigarette)" and its B-side "Fortune Teller", both written by Allen Toussaint (credited as Naomi Neville).

"Lipstick Traces" reached #28 on the U.S. Billboard R&B singles chart and #80 on the Billboard Hot 100, while "Fortune Teller" was later performed many other artists including The Who and The Rolling Stones. Spellman variously worked with Toussaint, Earl King ("Trick Bag"), Huey "Piano" Smith, Ernie K-Doe, Wilson Pickett, The Neville Brothers and The O'Jays.

Spellman was born in Pensacola, Florida.  He sang backing vocals on Ernie K-Doe's number one hit record, "Mother in Law". He recorded a single, "Word Game", on Atlantic Records in 1965, but later semi-retired from music to work in the beer industry.

In 1988, Collectables Records issued a retrospective album of 16 of Spellman's recordings from the 1960s. In 2009, he was inducted into the Louisiana Music Hall of Fame.

Spellman died of respiratory failure in June 2011, at the age of 79.

Personal life 
Spellman was Catholic.

References

External links
Louisianamusichalloffame.org
Rockabilly.nl

1931 births
2011 deaths
20th-century American singers
Ace Records (United States) artists
20th-century African-American male singers
American rhythm and blues singers
Deaths from respiratory failure
Musicians from Pensacola, Florida
Singers from Florida
20th-century American male singers
African-American Catholics
21st-century African-American people
Burials at Barrancas National Cemetery